This page shows results of Canadian federal elections in Northern Ontario.

Regional profile
Northern Ontario has traditionally been one of the more left-leaning areas of Ontario, with strong support for reformist and social democratic policies.  This region has traditionally been a two-way split between the Liberals and New Democratic Party (NDP).  However, the Liberals held every seat here during their Ontario sweeps from 1993 to 2000. The NDP regained two seats in 2004 and produced very strong results in many other ridings. They were unable to pick up any more in 2006, but came close in almost every riding, and they swept much of the region in 2008.

The Conservatives are traditionally weak in this region, except in the Parry Sound—Muskoka riding bordering Central Ontario, which they were able to pick up in the 2006 election in a very close race. The Conservatives also have some strength in Kenora, which has often seen close three-way races between all three major parties and was won by the Conservatives in 2008.  This changed in 2011, when the meltdown of Liberal support allowed the Conservatives to pick up an additional two seats, leaving the Liberals completely shut out of northern Ontario for the first time in decades.

In 2015, however, the Liberals took seven ridings, many of which they had lost in 2008.  The NDP held onto two ridings, while Parry Sound-Muskoka remained with the Conservatives.

In 2019, the Conservatives overtook the NDP for second place in terms of vote share in the region, and they took the riding of Kenora.

In 2021, the Conservatives overtook the Liberals for first place in terms of vote share in the region, but no seats changed parties.

2021 - 44th General Election

2019 - 43rd General Election

2015 - 42nd General Election

2011 - 41st general election

2008 - 40th general election

2006 - 39th general election

2004 - 38th general election

2000 - 37th general election

Politics of Northern Ontario
North